A Man Called God (also known as The Man Almighty) is a 2010 South Korean television series starring Song Il-kook, Han Chae-young, Kim Min-jong, Han Go-eun and Yoo In-young. It aired on MBC from March 6 to May 23, 2010 on Saturdays and Sundays at 21:45 for 24 episodes.

The -budget action romance series is based on the 1999 comic book of the same title by manhwa writer Park Bong-seong.

Plot
Choi Kang-ta is a super agent with a feared reputation who gains powers similar to a god. As a child, he lost his parents and was adopted by an American couple. After becoming an adult, he returns to Korea to exact revenge on the murderer of his father. He learns that there were four people responsible for his father's death. In the midst of carrying out his plans, his partner Vivian betrays him, putting his life in danger. He is nursed back to health by Bo-bae, a reporter he met by chance, and as he falls in love with her, his beliefs are shaken. After recovering from his wounds, he settles down in a slum neighborhood where he befriends the poor residents. For the first time in his life, he is surrounded by warmth and love in his new home, and finds peace within himself. But Hwang Woo-hyun, a high-ranking official at the Korean Central Intelligence Agency and heir to the Hwanglim Group empire, becomes enraged with jealousy that Choi Kang-ta stole Bo-bae away from him and decides to have him eliminated.

Cast
Song Il-kook as Michael King / Choi Kang-ta
Nam Da-reum as young Kang-ta
Han Chae-young as Jin Bo-bae 
Kim Min-jong as Hwang Woo-hyun
Han Go-eun as Vivian Castle
Yoo In-young as Jang-mi
Cho Jin-woong as Jang-ho
Choo Ja-hyun as Seo Mi-soo / Choi Kang-Hee
Jung Han-yong as Jang Yong
Lee Jae-yong as Hwang Dal-soo
Jung Dong-hwan as Lee Hyeong-seob
Kim Yong-gun as Kang Tae-ho
Lee Won-jong as Park Hong-choon
Shin Beom-do as Dennis
Lee Bo-hee as Han Soo-ra
Kim Min-ji as Hye-jung
Baek Il-seob as Hye-jung's grandfather
Maeng Sang-hoon as Seo Tae-jin
Kim Myung-gook
Lee Jung-hoon as Choi Hae-ryong, Kang-ta's father
Lee Jae-yoon as Park Chul
Yoon Gi-won as Director Kim Ji-won
Kim Hyo-jin as police woman
Samuel Kang as NIS agent
Lee Seung-hyung as Secretary Pyo
Shin Seung-hwan
Jung Dong-jin
Lee Won-seok
Yoon Beom
Jung Eun-woo as Son Chul
Lee Eun-bin
Pascal Dior as Pascal The Assassin

Ratings

Source: TNS Media Korea

Liancourt Rocks (Dokdo Islands) controversy
Originally set to premiere on August 21, 2012 on BS Nippon, the airing of A Man Called God was indefinitely delayed after the broadcaster feared public backlash, amid diplomatic tension and rising anti-Korean sentiment in Japan against Hallyu celebrities regarding the Korea-Japan territorial dispute over the Liancourt Rocks. Lead actor Song Il-gook had participated in a 220-kilometer patriotic relay swim to the Liancourt Rocks on August 15 to commemorate South Korea's Liberation Day, which marks the end of Japan's colonial rule in 1945.

International Broadcasts
In Indonesia, the series was broadcast by Lejel Television Network during 2012–2013. In the United States, the series began airing in February 2015 on KFVE/Honolulu on Sunday afternoons.

References

External links
 A Man Called God official MBC website 
 The Man Almighty at MBC Global Media
 

Korean-language television shows
2010 South Korean television series debuts
2010 South Korean television series endings
MBC TV television dramas
Television shows based on manhwa
South Korean action television series
South Korean romance television series